Recast may refer to:

 Recast (comics), a Korean comic
 Recast (language teaching), a language teaching technique
 Recast (manhwa), a six-volume manhwa series
 Amazon Fire TV Recast, an over-the-air DVR
 Recasting (EU Law), a method of updating EU legislation.

See also 
 Casting (disambiguation)